Gaspar de Bracamonte y Guzmán, 3rd Count of Peñaranda (c. 1595 – 14 December 1676) was a Spanish diplomat and statesman.

Life
Bracamonte was born in Peñaranda de Bracamonte, Spain, in 1595. He was the son of Alonso de Bracamonte, 1st Count of Peñaranda and the Spanish prince instructor. He married his niece María de Bracamonte, daughter of his older brother Balthazar Emmanuel, 2nd Count of Peñaranda. They had a son, Gregorio, 4th Count of Peñaranda, who died without legitimate heirs in 1689. Bracamonte died in Madrid, Spain, on 14 December 1676

Bracamonte led the Spanish delegation at the Peace of Westphalia in 1648, representing Philip IV. From 1659 to 1664 he was Spanish Viceroy of Naples and after death king Philip IV, one of the regents of the Kingdom of Spain. After the king's death in 1665, he returned to Spain and became an advisor of the king's widow, Mariana of Austria, who took over the regency for her son Charles.

External links

Bio Gaspar de Bracamonte y Guzmán 

1590s births
1676 deaths
People from the Province of Salamanca
Counts of Spain
Viceroys of Naples
Spanish people in Spanish controlled parts of Italy